Kimchi Cheese Smile is a South Korean sitcom revolving around the life of a kimchi-like (holding popular and conservative ideas) family headed by Shin Goo, who are to become in-laws to Sunwoo Eun-sook's cheese-like (rich and stylish) family. With contrasting classes and values, the sitcom follows these two families through various events in their lives.

Cast and characters
 Shin Goo as Shin Goo
 Husband of Eul-dong; Hye young, Byeong-jin, and Yeon-ji's father. He runs the Smile Photo studio and wants his family to make it big. He is full of bravado and often lies, but his dishonesty is always found out.
 Kim Eul-dong as Kim Eul-dong
 Wife of Shin Goo, she lives very frugally. She does not like her in-laws.
 Lee Hye-young as Shin Hye-young
 Eldest daughter of Shin goo and Eul-dong; she is a photographer and works at Smile Photo with her father.
 Lee Byeong-jin as Shin Byeong-jin
 Son of Shin Goo and husband of Soo-young; he is a timid person and slow at everything.
 Yoo Yeon-ji as Shin Yeon-ji
 Kim Bo-ra as young Shin Yeon-ji
 Shin Goo's daughter; she has a fussy personality. She is Seo Woo's best friend and later becomes Hyun-jin's girlfriend.
 Sunwoo Eun-sook as Sunwoo Eun-sook
 Mother-in-law of Byeong-jin. Though she is an elegant and cultured figure outwardly, she is quite the opposite on the inside.
 Jung Soo-young as Jung Soo-young
 Eun-sook's daughter and wife of Byeong-jin; she studies the piano.
 Park Yoo-sun as Shin Wol-do
 Daughter of Byeong-jin and Soo-young' she is mature for her age. She is close to her grandfather, Shin Goo, and likes Hyun Jin.
 Um Ki-joon as Um Ki-joon
 Friend of Byeong-jin and brother of Hyun-jin; he works as an announcer and has poor relations with Eun Sook. He has moved back to Shin Goo's house and developed a relationship with Hye-young.
 Lee Hyun Jin as Uhm Hyun-jin
 College swimmer and younger brother of Ki-joon; he lives in Shin Goo's house with Ki-Joon. He forms a relationship with Yeon-ji.
 Kim San-ho as Kim San-ho
 An unidentified man; he moved to Shin Goo's house after Hye-young's car accident and works as an assistant at the photo studio.
 Jang Ji-woo as Jang Ji-woo
 Friend and rival of Hyun-jin.
 Kim Soo-hyun as Kim Soo-hyun
 College swimmer; a junior of Hyun-jin
 Choi Kwon as Choi Kwon
 Friend of Hyun-jin; he is the captain of the swimming team.

Additional cast members
 Kim Ki-bang as chauffeur JungH
 Eun-sook's driver and bodyguard
 Seo Woo as Seo Woo
 A friend of Yeon-ji
 Oh Eun-chan as Shin Wol Sung
 Lee Ji-wan as Uhm Ji-Young
 Kim Ji-hoon as the doctor (ep. 70) and the journalist (ep. 83)
 Park Joo-yong
 Park Ji-hoon

References

External links
 Kimchi Cheese Smile official MBC website 
 Kimchi Cheese Smile DaumTV Zone 

MBC TV television dramas
South Korean television sitcoms
2007 South Korean television series debuts
2008 South Korean television series endings
Korean-language television shows
Television shows written by Park Hye-ryun
Television series by Doremi Entertainment